Major Ratchayothin Market is a market located next to Major Cineplex Ratchayothin bordering Phahonyothin Road in Chatuchak district, Bangkok, Thailand, opposite the Elephant Building. It is a wholesale market selling inexpensive clothing, fashion accessories and watches.

Nearby attractions 
 Major Cineplex Ratchayothin
 SCB Park Plaza
 Tesco Lotus Hypermarket Lat Phrao
 Index Living Mall Phahonyothin

Transportation 
The MRT's Phahon Yothin Station, about one kilometer away at Central Plaza Lat Phrao, is the nearest subway station.
Bus number 543 runs by Major Ratchoyothin.

Operation Hours 
 16:00 - 23:00 (every day)

See also 
 Bangkok markets

References

Retail markets in Bangkok
Chatuchak district